Galaxy Communications is a fictional American multinational media corporation in the DC Comics universe. It is owned and run by businessman and crime lord Morgan Edge.

Fictional history
Galaxy Communications is one of the world's leading telecommunications companies and a major economic engine of both Metropolis and the United States. It has a broadband division that supplies Americans with digital television, internet and phone services, and also produces several periodicals and books through its subsidiary Galaxy Publishing.

Originally spearheaded by Morgan Edge, an article by Daily Planet reporter Clark Kent revealed that Edge was also in command of Intergang, one of Metropolis's most notorious criminal organizations. This eventually led to Morgan's father Vincent Edge taking over Galaxy Communication. However, he too was ousted from the corporation, as it was exposed that he continuously made Cat Grant the victim of repeated sexual harassment.

Galaxy Communications shares a loose alliance with the Daily Planet, as they are two of the leading centers for truth and accuracy throughout the city's media. They are aggressively opposed by LexCorp, which operates WLEX-TV, a major television station in Metropolis; and LexCom, an internet site that serves as a digital news center. As it is offered over the internet, LexCom has a great access to mainstream America, minus the costs of publishing. LexCorp's owner, Lex Luthor, manipulates nearly two-thirds of Metropolis business. Galaxy Communications stands as the leading major media empire which provides the citizens of Metropolis with information and entertainment.

WGBS-TV, flagship station of the Galaxy Broadcasting System (GBS) television network, both subsidiaries of media conglomerate Galaxy Communications. Popular shows included The Midnight Show Starring Johnny Nevada (a fictional version of NBC's The Tonight Show, with Johnny Nevada being an analogue of Johnny Carson). There was a real-life WGBS-TV, in Philadelphia from 1985 to 1995; the call letters stood for Grant Broadcasting System, the original owners. The call letters were changed in 1995 to the current WPSG, after acquisition by the Paramount Stations Group and conversion into a UPN outlet; it is currently an affiliate of The CW and is owned by CBS Television Stations.

Between the early 1970s and mid-1980s, both Clark Kent and Lois Lane worked for WGBS after Galaxy Communications purchased the Daily Planet in a 1971 storyline, with Clark as the anchorman for the WGBS evening news. He was eventually joined by Lana Lang as a co-anchor. After John Byrne's revamp of Superman's origins, though, Clark and Lois were reverted to working at the Daily Planet once again. Galaxy Broadcasting and WGBS-TV still exist post-Crisis, however, and are usually used in any story where a television station or network is needed or shown. Post-Crisis, Clark, Lois and Lana never worked for the station. During the 1990s, both Jimmy Olsen and Cat Grant did work there.

The New 52
With the reboot of DC's line of comics in 2011, the Daily Planet was shown in the Superman comics as being bought by Morgan Edge and merged with the Galaxy Broadcasting System, similar to the Silver/Bronze Age continuity. In Action Comics, it is revealed that in the new history/universe, Clark Kent begins his journalism career in Metropolis roughly six years before Galaxy Broadcasting merges with the Daily Planet even taking on a criminal scandal involving the so-called "Mr. Metropolis" Glen Glenmorgan, CEO of Galaxy Broadcasting. Glenmorgan was spotted by the police after Superman dropped him off a tall building. However, Glenmorgan managed to avoid being arrested and later appeared on television where he expressed his belief that Superman is an alien and a danger to society. However, Kent's reporting later exposed him, and the intervention rove him to madness.  Along with being a writer for the Daily Star, partly because editor George Taylor was a friend of his adopted parents, Clark is an active blogger who speaks against political corruption and reports on the troubles of everyday citizens who are not often the focus of news media. While working at the Star, Clark meets Planet photographer Jimmy Olsen and the two become friends despite working at rival publications. Clark is also a great fan of Lois Lane's work at the Daily Planet, eventually meeting her through Jimmy. Months after Superman makes his public debut, Clark leaves the Daily Star on good terms and accepts a position at the Daily Planet.

After the merger with Galaxy Broadcasting, Lois was promoted to run the TV division, with Clark acting as an on-the-scene reporter for the TV division. Clark is later assigned the "Superman beat". But after rising tension between himself and Lois, as well as with Galaxy Broadcasting head Morgan Edge, Clark concludes that the Daily Planet is now more concerned with ratings and internet page views than actual journalism. He quits and goes off to begin an independent, internet news site with fellow journalist Cat Grant. Though Lois and Jimmy consider this to be a bad and risky decision, they continue to act as Clark's friends and confidants, offering aid when they can.

Subsidiaries
 Galaxy Broadcasting System - A television media empire owned by Morgan Edge as a subsidiary of the larger Galaxy Communications conglomerate. Based out of Metropolis, its primary news service is WGBS News.
 Galaxy Publishing - Galaxy Communications' publisher that produces several periodicals and books.
 Daily Planet - For a while the company owned the famous newspaper.

In other media

Television
 In the Super Friends animated series, the Galaxy Broadcasting Company and its mother conglomerate Galaxy Communications are both referenced in the series, but Morgan Edge never appears in the show.
 In Lois & Clark: The New Adventures of Superman, a character similar to Morgan Edge, named Bill Church, Jr. (portrayed by Bruce Campbell), appears as the head of the "Intergang" crime organization. Like Morgan Edge, Bill Church, Jr. owns a TV station, which is called "Multiworld Communications" instead of the comics "Galaxy Communications".
 GBS, or Galaxy Broadcasting System, is featured in the Young Justice. Its reporters include Cat Grant and Iris West. G. Gordon Godfrey becomes a pundit for the station and uses his program to defame extraterrestrials and the Justice League.
 In the Arrowverse show Superman & Lois, Galaxy Holdings is mentioned as one of Morgan Edge's companies.

Films
 In Superman IV: The Quest for Peace, a similar media mogul subplot is used. A rival newspaper owned by David Warfield takes over the Daily Planet adding sensationalism. 
 WGBS News can be seen in DC Extended Universe:
 In Man of Steel when Superman and General Zod flew past the WGBS building during their final battle in 2013.
 Makes a appearance in Aquaman showcasing Dr. Stephen Shin's conspiracy theories about Atlantis. 
 WGBS also appears in Shazam! detailing Philadelphia's new hero, like the bus rescue and the battle at the Christmas village with Doctor Sivana.
 WGBS appears in The Suicide Squad as the network where Bloodsport's daughter sees her father battling Starro the Conqueror.

Video games
 Galaxy Broadcasting System is referenced in Batman: Arkham City. The GBS Building can be seen next to Wayne Tower.
 Galaxy Broadcasting System appears in DC Universe Online. The GBS building is seen in Metropolis. GBS is broadcast on various TV screens throughout the game.

References

Superman
DC Comics organizations
Fictional companies
1970 in comics